In the Now is the second solo album by British singer-songwriter Barry Gibb, released on 7 October 2016 by Columbia Records. Although his second solo album (since 1984's Now Voyager), it is the first of all new material since the Bee Gees' final studio album This Is Where I Came In (2001). Gibb said of the album: "This is a dream come true for me. It's a new chapter in my life. I always hoped one day that the Bee Gees would be with Columbia or indeed Sony so, it's a great joy for me to start again this way with such great people."

The album was made available for pre-order on 12 August 2016 with the track "In the Now" as an "instant grat".

Background
Following the deaths of his brothers Maurice, Andy and Robin Gibb in 2003, 1988 and 2012, respectively, Barry Gibb thought his music career was over: "I was ready to quit. I was done. There was no point in going on any further. I’ve done solo work my whole life but never felt like a solo artist." Gibb said he "gave up for a long time" until he became interested in writing songs again. The album was written with his sons Stephen and Ashley Gibb, which according to Barry Gibb meant "there was this huge personal thing going on between the three of us for the whole of this album" and "that you could say whatever it is you’ve got to say and be as honest as you can".

Barry Gibb initially planned on recording a country album citing bluegrass music as an inspiration, but he was told by his record company that "they’d have a lot of trouble getting me on country radio". Instead, the album evolved into "classic pop" inspired by Carole King and Bruce Springsteen. Gibb has said of In the Now: "The album is my opinion of life, my feelings and my journey with my brothers, and without my brothers, with my parents and without my parents, and with my own family, seeing my kids have their own kids."

Track listing

Personnel 

 Barry Gibb – vocals, guitars
 Doug Emery – keyboards, musical director, programming (13-15)
 Ben Stivers – keyboards (1-12)
 Stephen Gibb – guitars (1-13), additional vocals (13)
 Dan Warner – guitars (1-12, 14, 15)
 Greg Leisz – pedal steel guitar (12)
 Alan Kendall – pedal steel guitar (14)
 Julio Hernandez – bass (1-12, 14)
 Lee Levin – drums, percussion (1-12)
 Richard Bravo – percussion (1-13)

Horn and String sections
 Doug Emery – arrangements
 Alfredo Olivia – string concertmaster
 Ed Maina – baritone saxophone 
 Ed Calle – soprano saxophone, tenor saxophone 
 John Kricker – trombone
 Jim Hacker and Doug Michels – trumpet 
 Eric Kerley – French horn (10)
 David Cole and Claudio Jaffe – cello
 Anthony Parce, Chauncey Patterson and Scott O'Donnell – viola 
 Huifang Chen, Monica Cheveresan, Carol Cole, Tomas Cotik, Scott Flavin, Valentin Mansurov, Alfredo Olivia, Evija Ozolins and Mark Schuppener – violin

Production 
 Barry Gibb – producer 
 John Merchant – producer (1-12), recording (1-12)
 Ethan Carson – recording (13-15)
 Matt LePlant – recording (13-15)
 Sam Bohl – recording assistant (1-12)
 Femio Hernandez – recording assistant (1-12)
 John Paterno – pedal steel recording  (12)
 Mick Guzauski – mixing at Barking Dog Studios (Los Angeles, California)
 Bob Ludwig – mastering at Gateway Mastering (Portland, Maine)
 Joe Lizano – audio technician
 Carlos R. Guzman – drum and percussion technician 
 Lazaro Rodriguez – guitar technician
 Dick Ashby – project coordinator 
 Danny Clinch – photography 
 Dave Bett – art direction

Charts

Weekly charts

Year-end charts

References

2016 albums
Columbia Records albums
Barry Gibb albums
Pop rock albums
Albums produced by Barry Gibb